The Palace Theater in Kinsley, Kansas is located at 222 E. 6th St. at the intersection of 6th and Niles Avenue (U.S. Highway 183), in the heart of Kinsely's historic commercial district, and was built in 1917.  It was listed on the National Register of Historic Places in 2005.

It is a two-part commercial block building with dark brown brick walls.

References

Theatres on the National Register of Historic Places in Kansas
Early Commercial architecture in the United States
Buildings and structures completed in 1917
Edwards County, Kansas
Theatres in Kansas